Kneass Boat Works was a shipbuilding company in San Francisco, California. To support the World War 2 demand for ships, Kneass Boat Works built: US Navy Sub chasers, US Army barges and tugboats. Kneass Boat Works was started by California native George Washington Kneass (1859–1923) in 1868, at 22 Mission Street, San Francisco. George Kneass started as an apprentice to boat builder Martin Vice. The two became partners operating a shipyard at Pier 70 at 671 Illinois Street, San Francisco. Business was good and in 1898 Kneass opened a second shipyard at 718 3rd Street, San Francisco. At its peak, Kneass employed 50 workers. 
George Kneass died in 1923 and his two sons, George, Jr. and Webster, took over the shipyard. Kneass built small boats, launches, rowboats, barges, lifeboats), sailboats, and a few wooden cruisers. For World War 2, in 1941 the company built a small emergency shipyard. The shipyard closed in 1970, but the site is now the art studio of Ruth Kneass; she kept the boatyard name for her studio.

Honors
The United States Government awarded Webster Lincoln Kneass a certificate of Outstanding Service to the Country for both its WWI and WWII efforts in 1945. Kneass Boat Works built over 5000 watercrafts for World War 1 and World War 2. Many of the watercraft were lifeboats and patrol boats. but some 150-foot minesweepers were also built. The U.S. Navy still uses a lifeboat that was designed by George Kneass.

Submarine chaser
They had a crew of 28. Power was provided by two  General Motors, Electro-Motive Division, 16-184A diesel engines, and two propellers. They were armed with one Bofors 40 mm gun, two Browning M2 .50 cal. 
machine guns, two depth charge projector "Y guns", and two depth charge tracks.

Notable ships
Notable ships include:
 an 1898 70-foot survey ship.
Three Adjutant-class minesweepers.
Quic Chakidn 1921 38-foot cruisers built for owner of Sierra Nevada Wood & Lumber Company, Walter Hobert, Jr. for his Lake Tahoe home.
Amy K IV 32-foot 1940 Yacht, was owned by the Terazas family. 
Merciqme Yacht was owned by Judy and Avery Blake, commodore of the Northern California Classic Yacht Association.
Siren 34-foot 1939 Yacht , owned by Alan Bowerman.
Marlin 46-foot 1928 Yacht, owned by Thomas Bottenberg of Vintage Yacht Partners
 Two patrol boats for Peru Navy in 1918, the El Captain I and El Captain 2.
 M 857 Hr.Ms. Boxtel  1954 114-foot Royal Netherlands Navy Beemster Class minesweeper, scrapped in 1976
 M 855 Hr.Ms. Breskens 1954 114-foot Royal Netherlands Navy Beemster Class minesweeper, renamed Kalbarrie then Pax
USS Nasomee (YTB-260), US Navy Tugboat, Cahto-class district harbor tug.

Ships

See also
California during World War II
Maritime history of California
Wooden boats of World War 2

References

American Theater of World War II
1940s in California
American boat builders
Defunct shipbuilding companies of the United States